Papua New Guinea Yachting Association is the official body for recreational sailing in Papua New Guinea. It is a member of the International Sailing Federation. The 2015 Pacific Games will be held in Port Moresby, Papua New Guinea and will feature sailing as one of the sports.

Club presidents
 Andrew Locke (1991 - 1997)

International Sailing Federation
Sailing associations
Sport in Papua New Guinea